Robert Taimoe Tapaitau (born 10 March 1974) is a Cook Islands politician and Deputy Prime Minister of the Cook Islands. He represents the electorate of Penrhyn as an independent.He is the son of former Democratic party cabinet minister Tepure Tapaitau.

Tapaitau was born on Rarotonga and educated at Avarua School and Tereora College. He has previously lived in Australia and worked as a builder. He was first elected at the 2018 election. Following the election he decided to back the Cook Islands Party government of Henry Puna, and was appointed to Cabinet as Minister of Infrastructure, Environmental Services, Transport, and Outer Islands Special Projects.

On 1 October 2020, following the retirement of Henry Puna, he was appointed Deputy Prime Minister. He retained all his Cabinet portfolios. A further reshuffle in June 2021 saw him gain responsibility for Energy, Renewable Energy, Marine Resources and the Outer islands.

On 7 October 2021 Tapaitau stepped aside as a Minister after being charged with conspiracy to defraud. On 17 May 2022 he was reinstated as Deputy Prime Minister and to most of his portfolios, but stripped of his responsibility for the National Environment Services and Infrastructure Cook Islands to avoid a conflict of interest with his ongoing criminal trial.

He was re-elected at the 2022 Cook Islands general election.

Notes

References

Living people
1974 births
People from Rarotonga
Members of the Parliament of the Cook Islands
Deputy Prime Ministers of the Cook Islands